The 1982 World Championship Tennis Winter Finals was a men's tennis tournament played on indoor carpet courts. It was the 2nd edition of the World Championship Tennis Winter Finals and was part of the 1982 World Championship Tennis circuit. It was played in the Cobo Arena in Detroit, Michigan in the United States from January 24 to January 31, 1983.

Final

Singles

 Ivan Lendl defeated  Guillermo Vilas 7–5, 6–2, 2–6, 6–4
 It was Lendl's 1st title of the year and the 35th of his career.

References

 
World Championship Tennis Winter Finals
WCT Finals
Tennis in Detroit
Sports competitions in Detroit
World Championship Tennis Winter Finals
World Championship Tennis Winter Finals
World Championship Tennis Winter Finals
Tennis tournaments in Michigan